Penn State Berks is a commonwealth campus of Pennsylvania State University located in Spring Township in Berks County, Pennsylvania.

History
First known as Wyomissing Polytechnic Institute, Penn State Berks became part of the Penn State system in 1958. The Berks campus has experienced many changes since then. WPI occupied the original Sacred Heart Church building on Hill Road, where the McDonald's Restaurant now stands, from 1930 to 1958. Its facilities were offered to Penn State to establish Penn State Wyomissing Center. It moved to its present Spring Township location in 1972. Dormitories were first added in 1990 with additional dorms in 2001, which made Berks a commuter as well as a residential campus.

Student enrollment at Penn State Berks has increased steadily since 1972, when approximately 500 students attended. Today, there are an estimated 2,800 students enrolled.  The campus currently has 15 buildings on 241 acres (1 km²) of land. There are 100 full-time and 70 part-time faculty members.

While being a commonwealth campus of the state land-grant university, since 1997 it has offered baccalaureate degrees independently from The Pennsylvania State University University Park campus in partnership with a neighboring campus under the title of Berks and Lehigh Valley College. Under a university-ordered reconstruction, Penn State Berks and Penn State Lehigh Valley were split in 2005. Penn State Berks became a stand-alone college in the Penn State system and Penn State Lehigh Valley became a part of the University College system.

Student life
Penn State Berks has over 50 active clubs.  All student organizations are overseen by the Student Government Association, which requires that all clubs complete 24 hours of community service per semester in return for providing funds.

Housing on campus

Athletics
Penn State–Berks, known athletically as the Nittany Lions, compete at the NCAA Division III level; which is also a member of the North Eastern Athletic Conference (NEAC).

Penn State–Berks fields 12 varsity sports:

Men's
 Baseball
 Basketball
 Cross Country
 Golf
 Soccer
 Tennis

Women's
 Basketball
 Cross Country
 Soccer
 Softball
 Tennis
 Volleyball

Club Sports
Penn State–Berks also fields a number of competitive club sports that have no affiliation with the NCAA or NEAC.

Club programs include:

 Ice hockey
 Lacrosse
 Rugby
 Track and field

 Bowling
 Cheerleading
 Track and field
 Equestrian

See also
Pennsylvania State University Commonwealth campuses
Penn State Lehigh Valley

References

External links
 Official website
 Official athletics website

Pennsylvania State University colleges
Educational institutions established in 1958
Universities and colleges in Berks County, Pennsylvania
1958 establishments in Pennsylvania
United East Conference schools
Berks